The Sultan Bin Ali Al Owais Cultural Awards (or Al Owais Awards) are a biannual prize for literary and cultural achievement in the Arab world. It is administered by the Sultan Bin Al Owais Cultural Foundation of the United Arab Emirates. The award was established by the late Emirati businessman and philanthropist Sultan Bin Ali Al Owais. The awards were first given out in 1988-89. 

The Al Owais Cultural Awards are given in four categories: Poetry, Novels, Criticism/Literature Studies, and Human/Future Studies.

In 2004, the poetry prize was given to Iraqi poet Saadi Youssef but was controversially withdrawn after he criticized UAE ruler Sheikh Zayed bin al-Nahiyan.

Winners
List of winners:

1988–1989
 Poetry: Fadwa Touqan
 Stories, Novels & Drama: Sa’ad Allah Wanous, Hanna Mena  
 Criticism & Literature Studies: Jabra Ebrahim Jabra, Ali Jawad Al Taher

1990–1991
 Stories, Novels & Drama: Alfred Farag, Abdul Rahman Mouneef
 Criticism & Literature Studies: Ehssan Abbas  
 Human & Future Studies: Zaki Nageeb Mahmood, Fuad Zacharia  
 Cultural & Scientific Achievements: Mohammad Mahdi Al Jawaheri

1992–1993
 Poetry: Abdullah Al Baraddouni  
 Stories, Novels & Drama: Sulaiman Fayyad, Sun-Allah Ebrahim
 Criticism & Literature Studies: Yumna Al Eid, Farooq Abdul Qader
 Human & Future Studies: Abdullah Abdul Dayem  
 Cultural & Scientific Achievements: Nizar Qabbani

1994–1995
 Poetry: Abdul Wahhab Al Bayati  
 Stories, Novels & Drama: Edward Al Kharrat  
 Criticism & Literature Studies: Nasser Al deen Al Assad  
 Human & Future Studies:  Awatef Abdul Rahman, Mohammed Ghanem Al Rumaihi  
 Cultural & Scientific Achievements:  Hamad Al Jasser

1996–1997
 Poetry: Ahmed Abdul Mutti Hijazi, Ebrahim Nassrullah  
 Stories, Novels & Drama: Jamal Al Ghitani, Waleed Ekhlassi  
 Criticism & Literature Studies: Jaber Assfour, Shukri Ayyad  
 Human & Future Studies: Mohammed Jaber Al Anssari, Fahmi Jada’an, Mohammed Jaber Al Anssari 
 Cultural & Scientific Achievements: Edward Saeed

1998–1999
 Poetry: Mohammed Afifi Mattar 
 Stories, Novels & Drama: Fuad Al Takarli  
 Criticism & Literature Studies: Abdullah Al Ghozami  
 Human & Future Studies: Saleh Ahmad Al Ali, Nasseef Nassar  
 Cultural & Scientific Achievements: Yousef Al Qaradhawi

2000–2001
 Poetry: Qassim Haddad  
 Stories, Novels & Drama: Zakaria Tamir, Mohammad Al Bassati  
 Criticism & Literature Studies: Mohsin Jassim Al Mosawi  
 Human & Future Studies: Abdul Wahab Al Maseeri  
 Cultural & Scientific Achievements: Al-Arabi magazine

2002–2003
 Poetry: Hasab Al Sheikh Ja’afar 
 Stories, Novels & Drama: Muhammad Khudayyir  
 Criticism & Literature Studies: Mustafa Abdou Nassif  
 Human & Future Studies: Mahmoud Ameen Al A’lem  
 Cultural & Scientific Achievements: Mahmoud Darwish, Adunis

2004–2005
 Poetry: Mohammed Al Maghout  
 Stories, Novels & Drama: Iz Aldin Al Madani
 Criticism & Literature Studies: Mohammed Meftah
 Human & Future Studies: Antoon Zahlan
 Cultural & Scientific Achievements: Tharwat Okasha

2006–2007
 Poetry: Mohammed Bennis  
 Stories Novels & Drama: Yousef el-Sharoni, Elias Khoury  
 Criticism & Literature Studies: Abdelfattah Kilito  
 Human & Future Studies: Hisham D'jait  
 Cultural & Scientific Achievements: Juma Al Majid, Salma Khadra Jayyusi

2008–2009
 Poetry: Abdulaziz Al-Maqaleh  
 Stories, Novels & Drama: El Taher Wattar  
 Criticism & Literature Studies: Abdul Salam Misaddi
 Human & Future Studies: Galal Amin  
 Cultural & Scientific Achievements: Sheikha Fatima Bint Mubarak

2010–2011
 Poetry: Mohammed Ali Shams Al Din
 Stories, Novels & Drama: Radwa Ashour  
 Criticism & Literature Studies: Faisal Darraj  
 Human & Future Studies: Abdul Aziz Al Douri  
 Cultural & Scientific Achievements: Amin Maalouf

2012–2013
 Poetry: Mohammad Ibrahim Abu Senna, Nazih Abu Afash
 Stories, Novels & Drama: Mohammed Azeddine Tazi
 Criticism & Literature Studies: Ahmed Etman
 Human & Future Studies: El Sayed Yassin
 Cultural & Scientific Achievements: Dar Al Khaleej Printing & Publishing

2014–2015
 Poetry: Habib Al Sayegh
 Stories, Novels & Drama: Yusuf al-Qa'id, Ismail Fahd Ismail
 Criticism & Literature Studies: Salah Fadl, Kamal Abu-Deeb
 Human & Future Studies: Roshdi Rashed
 Cultural & Scientific Achievements: King Faisal Foundation

2016–2017
 Poetry: Chawki Bazih
 Stories, Novels & Drama: Hoda Barakat, Abdel Khaliq al-Rikabi
 Criticism & Literature Studies: Hammadi Hmaida Sammoud
 Human & Future Studies: Georges Corm
 Cultural & Scientific Achievements: United Arab Emirates University

2018–2019
 Poetry: Ali Ja'far al-Allaq
 Stories, Novels & Drama: Alawiya Sobh
 Criticism & Literature Studies: Mohammed Lutfi Al Yusufi
 Human & Future Studies: Haidar Ibrahim Ali
 Cultural & Scientific Achievements: Mai bint Mohammed Al Khalifa

2020–2021
 Poetry: Elias Lahoud
 Stories, Novels & Drama: Nabil Suleiman
 Criticism & Literature Studies: Abdul Malik Murtad
 Human & Future Studies: Ahmed Zayed
 Cultural & Scientific Achievements: Assilah Forum Foundation

References

External links
Sultan Bin Ali Al Owais Cultural Award, official website

Arabic literary awards
Awards established in 1988
Arabic poetry awards
Fiction awards
Literary awards honoring writers
Emirati awards
1988 establishments in the United Arab Emirates